is a Japanese linguist. He makes a study of Chinese phonology and of Old Japanese transcribed into Chinese characters by sound.

Work 
He is renowned for a research on the Nihon Shoki. He divides the history book into two groups and claims that Group α (Vol. 14–21, 24–27, 30) was documented by native speakers of the Northern Chinese dialect during the Tang dynasty while Group β (Vol. 1–13, 22–23, 28–29) was written by Japanese. He noticed that Group α is standard written Chinese and applies Chinese characters consistently to Japanese words, but Group β is Japanized Chinese and indiscriminates some characters that were distinguished in Northern Chinese.

He received the 20th Dr Kindaichi Memorial Award (1992) for Chronicles of Ancient Phonology (古代の音韻と日本書紀の成立』に対して).

References 

Linguists from Japan
Living people
Phonologists
1949 births